The Abdus Salam International Centre for Theoretical Physics (ICTP) is an international research institute for physical and mathematical sciences that operates under a tripartite agreement between the Italian Government, United Nations Educational, Scientific and Cultural Organization (UNESCO), and International Atomic Energy Agency (IAEA).  It is located near the Miramare Park, about 10 kilometres from the city of Trieste, Italy. The centre was founded in 1964 by Pakistani Nobel Laureate Abdus Salam.

ICTP is part of the Trieste System, a network of national and international scientific institutes in Trieste, promoted by the Italian physicist Paolo Budinich.

Mission
 Foster the growth of advanced studies and research in physical and mathematical sciences, especially in support of excellence in developing countries;
 Develop high-level scientific programmes keeping in mind the needs of developing countries, and provide an international forum of scientific contact for scientists from all countries;
 Conduct research at the highest international standards and maintain a conducive environment of scientific inquiry for the entire ICTP community.

Research
Research at ICTP is carried out by seven scientific sections:

High Energy, Cosmology and Astroparticle Physics
Condensed Matter and Statistical Physics
Mathematics
Earth System Physics
Science, Technology and Innovation
Quantitative Life Sciences
New Research Areas (which includes studies related to Energy and Sustainability and Computing Sciences)

The scientific community at ICTP includes staff research scientists, postdoctoral fellows and long- and short-term visitors engaged in independent or collaborative research. Throughout the year, the sections organize conferences, workshops, seminars and colloquiums in their respective fields. ICTP also has visitor programmes specifically for scientific visitors from developing countries, including programmes under federation and associateship schemes.

Postgraduate programmes
ICTP offers educational training through its pre-PhD programmes and degree programmes (conducted in collaboration with other institutes).

Pre-PhD programmes
 Postgraduate diploma programmes in Condensed Matter Physics, High Energy Physics, Mathematics, Earth System Physics, and Quantitative Life Sciences for students from developing countries.
 The Sandwich Training Educational Programme (STEP) for students from developing countries already enrolled in PhD programmes in the fields of physics and mathematics.

In collaboration with other institutes, ICTP offers masters and doctoral degrees in physics and mathematics.
 Joint ICTP/SISSA PhD Programme in Physics and Mathematics 
 Joint PhD Programme in Earth Science and Fluid Mechanics
 Joint Laurea Magistralis in Physics
 Joint ICTP/Collegio Carlo Alberto Program in Economics
 International Master, Physics of Complex Systems
 Master of Advanced Studies in Medical Physics
 Masters in High Performance Computing

In addition, ICTP collaborates with local laboratories, including Elettra Synchrotron Light Laboratory, to provide fellowships and laboratory opportunities.

Prizes and awards
ICTP has instituted awards to honour and encourage high-level research in the fields of physics and mathematics.
 The Dirac Medal – For scientists who have made significant contributions to theoretical physics.
 The ICTP Prize – For young scientists from developing countries.
 ICO/ICTP Gallieno Denardo Award – For significant contributions to the field of optics.
 The Ramanujan Prize – For young mathematicians from developing countries.
 The Walter Kohn Prize – Given jointly by ICTP and the Quantum ESPRESSO foundation, for work in quantum mechanical materials or molecular modelling, performed by a young scientist working in a developing country.

Partner institutes
One of ICTP's goals is to set up regional centres of excellence around the globe. The idea is to bring ICTP's unique blend of high-quality physics and mathematics education and high-level science meetings closer to scientists everywhere. On February 6, 2012, ICTP opened a partner institute  (ICTP South American Institute for Fundamental Research) in São Paulo, Brazil. Its activities are modelled on those of the ICTP and include schools and workshops, as well as a visiting scientists programme.

On October 18, 2018, a partner institute (ICTP-EAIFR, the East African Institute for Fundamental Research), was inaugurated in Kigali, Rwanda. In November 2018, ICTP opened the International Centre for Theoretical Physics Asia-Pacific (ICTP-AP) in Beijing, China, in collaboration with the University of the Chinese Academy of Sciences.

Journal
In 2007 ICTP created the peer-reviewed open-access Journal "African Review of Physics" under the then name "African Physical Review".

See also
International School for Advanced Studies
University of Trieste
Joint Institute for Nuclear Research

References

External links

International Atomic Energy Agency
International research institutes for mathematics
Physics institutes
Physics organizations
Research institutes established in 1964
Trieste
UNESCO
Abdus Salam
Research institutes in Italy
Italy and the United Nations
Theoretical physics institutes